Catherine Wilkin (born October 1950) is a New Zealand actor who has worked in New Zealand and Australia.

Career
Wilkin has acted in many Australian television shows, with a mix of guest and multi-episode recurring roles.

She played the recurring role lawyer Kate McGrath in Cop Shop in 1981. Her then-partner, Bill Stalker, was at that time a regular in the series. In 1983 she played Janice Young in Prisoner. Other roles include Paulyne Grey in Rafferty's Rules, Katherine Jensen in Embassy, Sally Downie in Blue Heelers and Liz Ryan in McLeod's Daughters. Wilkin also starred in the Saddle Club as the well-loved Mrs. Reg, the mother of the owner of the stable, in 2001.

Theatre performances include Miss Prism in The Importance of Being Earnest by Oscar Wilde in 2010 for Auckland Theatre Company. In 2012 she played Linda in the Peach Theatre Company production of Death of a Salesman.

Personal life 
She was injured in the November 1981 motorcycle accident that killed her then-partner, actor Bill Stalker.

Filmography

References

External links

1945 births
Australian television actresses
English emigrants to Australia
English emigrants to New Zealand
Living people
Logie Award winners
New Zealand stage actresses
New Zealand television actresses